Satanized (A Journey Through Cosmic Infinity) is the sixth studio album by Austrian black metal band Abigor. It was released in 2001.

Track listing

Credits 
 P.K. (Virus 666, Peter Kubik) – Guitars, Keyboards
 Thurisaz LiD – Vocals, Bass
Moritz Neuner – Drums

Additional personnel
Lucia-Mariam Fåroutan-Kubik – Keyboards
Georg Hrauda – Producer
Raevyn E.R. – Logo

External links

References 

2001 albums
Abigor albums
Napalm Records albums